Charles Ernest Llewellyn Jones (3 November 1902 – 10 December 1959) was a cricketer who played four Test matches for West Indies in the 1930s.

Born in Georgetown, British Guiana, Jones was a left-handed batsman and a slow left-arm bowler who made his first-class debut in October 1925 in the Inter-Colonial match against Barbados, scoring 14 runs and taking one wicket as British Guiana won by eight wickets.

In 1930, when the MCC visited the Caribbean under the leadership of F.S.G. Calthorpe, Jones played against them three times in February, twice for British Guiana and once whilst making his Test Match debut.  His selection for the 3rd Test of the four-match series, played at Bourda, Georgetown was more to do with the West Indies’ usual policy of using a few players from the host island in an effort to keep the expenses down.  In an historic victory over England, Jones' contribution was minimal, scoring just 6 and 2, taking two catches but failing to take a wicket with the ball.  He played only occasionally for the next five years but aided by some useful scores with the bat in that time, Jones made a further three Test appearances against England sides led by R.E.S. Wyatt in 1935.  In the second Test of the series, played at Port-of-Spain, Trinidad, and where he opened with C.M. Christiani, he scored 19 runs in both innings.  This subsequently proved to be his highest Test score but he failed to take a single Test wicket in his career.  In all first-class matches he took 24 wickets at an average of 44.12 apiece and scored 917 runs at an average of 21.83. In a career that ended in January 1939, his highest score was an unbeaten 89, scored at home in a comprehensive victory over Barbados. No Obituary appeared within the pages of Wisden for Jones.

References 
  World Cricketers - A Biographical Dictionary by Christopher Martin-Jenkins published by Oxford University Press (1996),
  The Wisden Book of Test Cricket, Volume 1 (1877–1977) compiled and edited by Bill Frindall published by Headline Book Publishing (1995),
  The Complete Record of West Indian Test Cricketers by Bridgette Lawrence & Ray Goble published by ACL & Polar Publishing (UK) Ltd. (1991),
  www.cricketarchive.com/Archive/Players.

1902 births
1959 deaths
Guyanese cricketers
West Indies Test cricketers
Sportspeople from Georgetown, Guyana
Guyana cricketers